Ilves (Finnish for "Lynx") is a Finnish professional ice hockey team based in Tampere. They play in the Liiga at the Tampere Deck Arena.

The colors of Ilves, green, yellow, and black, were taken from what was then the coat of arms of the city of Tampere.

History
With sixteen championships, Ilves is the second most successful hockey team in the Finnish championship league, the Liiga, after their local rival Tappara. The club was founded in the spring of 1931, and it played its first game against Tampereen Palloilijat the next winter. In the late 1930s, Ilves won three Finnish championship titles as the first Tampere-based hockey team.

After World War II, Ilves started playing its home games at the then new Koulukatu ice rink. It had another championship spree in 1945–47 when it stayed undefeated for over four years (albeit playing only 36 games during that period).

In 1954, Ilves was for the first and so far only time relegated to the second highest level of Finnish hockey but managed to return to the top tier only one year later.

The current logo was designed by Rauno Broms in 1963. In 1965, Ilves moved, along with its local rivals Tappara and KooVee, to the new Hakametsä arena, where they played until 2021.

The last Finnish Cup competition in hockey was held in 1971. Ilves won the title and has therefore been the reigning champion since. In 1972, it also won another league championship; its 15th championship in total.

During the late 1970s, Ilves went through lean times. Finally, when Koovee, which was in no better condition, was relegated at the end of the 1979–80 season, the two clubs decided to sign an agreement of cooperation. The best players of Koovee moved to Ilves, the most notable of them being Risto Jalo.

In 1985, Ilves claimed its 16th and most recent championship. Along with Risto Jalo, the key players of that team were Raimo Helminen, Mikko Mäkelä, Ville Siren, and Jukka Tammi. Repeating this success proved difficult, however, when in the following summer four players left the team to play in the NHL.

In the late 1980s, Ilves had another brief stint of moderate success when coached by Sakari Pietilä. It finished first after the regular season in 1988 but was eliminated in the first round of playoffs. The next year it came away with a bronze medal, and finally in 1990 it reached the finals, only to lose to TPS.

For most of the 1990s, the club struggled with financial problems and unclear issues concerning ownership. In sports performance, the low point was in the spring of 1995, when Ilves finished last in the SM-liiga and had to fight the lower league teams SaPKo and SaiPa for their place among the elite for the next year.

Ilves managed to avoid relegation and was promptly reborn as a viable championship candidate, reaching the semifinals in 1997 and the finals a year after that.

The 2000s were a fairly mediocre period in Ilves history. After their bronze medal win in 2001, Ilves lost in the first round of the playoffs in six of the next seven seasons and missing the playoffs altogether in 2003. They managed to avoid relegation in 2010, 2012 and 2013.

Honors

SM-sarja
  SM-sarja Aaro Kivilinna memorial award: 1936, 1937, 1938, 1945, 1946, 1947, 1950, 1951, 1952
  SM-sarja Kanada-malja: 1957, 1958, 1960, 1962, 1966, 1972
  SM-sarja Aaro Kivilinna memorial award: 1935, 1948, 1949
  SM-sarja Kanada-malja: 1965, 1968, 1969, 1970
  SM-sarja Aaro Kivilinna memorial award: 1934, 1939, 1941, 1943
  SM-sarja Kanada-malja: 1963, 1964, 1967, 1974, 1975

SM-liiga
  SM-liiga Kanada-malja: 1985
  SM-liiga Kanada-malja: 1990, 1998
  SM-liiga Kanada-malja: 1983, 1989, 2001, 2022

Players

Current roster

Honored members

2  Jarmo Wasama
7  Aarne Honkavaara
13  Risto Jalo
14  Lasse Oksanen
16  Jorma Peltonen, Marianne Ihalainen
30  Jukka Tammi
41  Raimo Helminen

Source: Ilves-Historia

Number 24 has not been officially retired, but is not in use. It was last worn by Veikko Suominen, who died during the 1978–79 season.

Coaches

Current staff

 Head Coach:  Antti Pennanen
 Assistant Coach:  Raimo Helminen
 Assistant Coach:  Pasi Saarinen
 Assistant Coach:  Jarkko Näppilä
 Goaltending Coach:  Markus Korhonen
 Team Manager:  Timo Peltomaa

All-time head coaches

Niilo Tammisalo 1931–37
Risto Lindroos 1937–46, 1949–53
Aarne Honkavaara 1952–61, 1967–68
Henry Kvist 1946–49
Seppo Helle 1961–64
Rauli Virtanen 1964–65
Erkki Koiso 1965–66
Raimo Vasama 1968–71, 1972–75
Juhani Ruusunen 1971–72, 1976–80
Len Lunde 1972–73
Matti Reunamäki 1974–75
Esko Mäkinen 1974–76
Raimo Määttänen 1980–82
Seppo Hiitelä 1982–87, 1990–91
Matti Kaario 1986–87, 1990–91, 1999*
Sakari Pietilä 1987–90, 2006–2009
Anatoli Bogdanov 1991–93
Jukka Jalonen 1992–95
Heikki Vesala 1994–95
Vladimir Jursinov Jr. 1995–99
Heikki Mälkiä 1999–2001, 2009–10*
Ari-Pekka Selin 2001–03
Teijo Räsänen 2002–03
Vaclav Sykora 2003–05
Curt Lindström 2004–05
Kari Eloranta 2005–06
Petteri Hirvonen 2006*
Sakari Pietilä 2006–09
Juha Pajuoja 2010–12*
Seppo Hiitelä 2011–12
Raimo Helminen 2012–2013
Tuomas Tuokkola 2013–2016 January
Kari Heikkilä 2016 January–March
Kari Kivi 2017–2020 September 
Jouko Myrrä 2020 October–2022 October
Antti Pennanen 2022 October–present

(* = interim coach)

Other sports

In addition to hockey and football, Ilves has a futsal team in Finnish league which has won the Finnish championship five times (2004, 2005, 2007, 2010, and 2011) and the cup competition twice (2006, 2010), a floorball team at second highest level and a women's ringette team. It has numerous boys' and girls' junior teams in ice hockey, soccer, floorball (boys only), and ringette (girls only), making the organization the largest sports club in Finland.

In the past, Ilves has also competed in American football, basketball, bowling, figure skating, handball, and volleyball. It has won a bronze medal in American football and a silver one in handball. Also, Ilves has won the Finnish Cup in handball.

See also
Tappara
KOOVEE

References

External links
  

Sport in Tampere
Liiga teams
Ice hockey clubs established in 1931
1931 establishments in Finland
Liiga